Martin Patrick O'Connell,  (August 1, 1916 – August 11, 2003) was a Canadian politician.

Born in Victoria, British Columbia, he received a Bachelor of Arts from Queen's University. During World War II, he was a captain in the Royal Canadian Army Service Corps. After the war, he received an MA and a Ph.D from the  University of Toronto.

In 1965, he ran for the House of Commons of Canada for the riding of Greenwood. He was defeated but was elected in 1968 in the riding of Scarborough East. A Liberal, he was defeated in the 1972 elections but was re-elected again in 1974. He ran twice more unsuccessfully in 1979 and 1980. From 1969 to 1971, he was the Parliamentary Secretary to the Minister of Regional Economic Expansion. From 1971 to 1972, he was the Minister of State and in 1972 he was the Minister of Labour.

After his defeat in the 1972 General Election, O'Connell served as Principal Secretary to Prime Minister Trudeau from 1973 until he was once again elected to the House of Commons in the 1974 General Election.

From 1978 to 1979, he again was the Minister of Labour.

From 1984 to 1989, he was the Chairman of the Council of Governors of the Canadian Centre for Occupational Health and Safety. In 1993 he was the co-founder and first co-chairman of The Canadian Foundation for the Preservation of Chinese Cultural and Historical Treasures.

References
 
 

1916 births
2003 deaths
Canadian people of Irish descent
Liberal Party of Canada MPs
Members of the House of Commons of Canada from Ontario
Members of the King's Privy Council for Canada
Politicians from Victoria, British Columbia
Queen's University at Kingston alumni
University of Toronto alumni
Canadian Army personnel of World War II
Canadian military personnel from British Columbia
Royal Canadian Army Service Corps officers